Wedgeworth, also known as Greenwood, is an unincorporated community in Hale County, Alabama, United States.

History
Wedgeworth is named for the family of John Wedgeworth, an early settler of the area. A post office operated under the name Greenwood from 1895 to 1904, and under the name Wedgeworth from 1904 to 1955.

References

Unincorporated communities in Hale County, Alabama
Unincorporated communities in Alabama